Buñuel may refer to:

People
Luis Buñuel (1900–1983), a Spanish-Mexican filmmaker
Juan Luis Buñuel (1934–2017), a French-born filmmaker, son of the previous
Diego Buñuel (born 1975), a French-American filmmaker, son of the previous

Places
Buñuel, a municipality in the province and autonomous community of Navarre, Spain

Other
Buñuel in the Labyrinth of the Turtles, a 2018 film about Luis Buñuel